A list of windmills in Maine-et-Loire, France.

External links
French windmills website

Windmills in France
Maine-et-Loire
Buildings and structures in Maine-et-Loire